Pavel Gerasimovich Poltoratskiy (c. 1888, Novocherkassk – 21 July 1918) was a Bolshevik revolutionary.  He served as People's Commissar for Labor in the early Turkmen Soviet Socialist Republic and as editor of the daily newspaper Sovetskiy Turkmenistan. 

Poltoratskiy worked as a typesetter. He became active as a revolutionary in Rostov-on-Don and Baku, but was imprisoned in 1913. In 1917 he became chairman of the Soviet established in Kogon, Uzbekistan. He was sent as a delegate to the First All-Russian Congress of Workers' and Soldiers' Deputies' Soviets.  According to another source, he was also a railroad worker.

Career
Poltoratskiy traveled from Tashkent to Merv, arriving 13 July 1918, leading a small group of revolutionaries. He was soon taken captive by the Transcaspian Government which had recently been formed by Mensheviks and Socialist Revolutionaries. He was executed by firing squad near a brickyard in Merv on 21 July 1918.

Legacy
From 17 July 1919 until 27 October 1927 the capital city of Turkmenistan, Ashgabat, was named Poltoratsk in his honor.

References

1918 deaths
Asian newspaper editors
Executed revolutionaries
Members of the Communist Party of the Soviet Union executed by the Soviet Union
Old Bolsheviks
People executed by firing squad
Russian revolutionaries
Turkmenistan communists
Year of birth uncertain